Pyar Ka Rog is a 1994 Bollywood film written and directed by Akashdeep. Ravi Behl, Shammi Kapoor, Anupam Kher and Sheeba were the leading artists. Sanjay Dutt, Vinod Khanna and Chunkey Pandey made cameo appearance Archana Puran Singh s.

Soundtrack
The music was composed by Bappi Lahiri and the lyrics were penned by Rani Malik.
" Dil Pe Hai Tera Naam" - Udit Narayan, Kavita Krishnamurthy
"Ja Ja Ke Kahaan Minnaten Fariyad Karoge" - Kumar Sanu, Alka Yagnik
"Ja Ja Ke Kahaan Minnaten Fariyad Karoge v2" - Kumar Sanu, Alka Yagnik
"Mummy Kaheti Hain I Love You" - Pankaj Udhas
"Tana Nana Tana Nana" - Bappi Lahiri, Sharon Prabhakar
"Tum Ho Bilkul Buddhu" - Babla Mehta, Debashish Dasgupta, Bela Sulakhe

References

External links
 

1994 films
1990s Hindi-language films
Films scored by Bappi Lahiri